Sedin may refer to:

People
The Sedin Twins, two Swedish former professional ice hockey players who are twin brothers
Daniel Sedin (born 1980), brother to Henrik
Henrik Sedin (born 1980), brother to Daniel

James Sedin (1930–2021), American ice hockey player

Places
Sedin 1, a village in Khuzestan Province, Iran
Sedin 2, a village in Khuzestan Province, Iran